Hazelgreen is an unincorporated community in Ritchie County, West Virginia, United States. Hazelgreen had a post office, which closed on May 13, 1995.

References

Unincorporated communities in Ritchie County, West Virginia
Unincorporated communities in West Virginia